Yongdingmenwai station is an interchange station on Line 8 and Line 14 of the Beijing Subway.

The Line 14 station was opened on December 26, 2015. The Line 8 station was opened on December 30, 2018.

Station Layout 
Both the line 8 and 14 stations have underground island platforms.

Exits 
There are 4 exits, lettered A, C, E, and F. Exits C, E, and F are accessible.

Gallery

References

Railway stations in China opened in 2015
Beijing Subway stations in Dongcheng District